USS Donnell (DE-56), a  in service with the United States Navy from 1943 to 1945. She was scrapped in 1946.

History
Donnell was named in honor of Ensign Earl Roe Donnell (1918–1942), who was killed in action while serving in Scouting Squadron 6 aboard the aircraft carrier  during an attack on the Marshall Islands on 6 February 1942. Donnell was laid down on 27 November 1942 at the Bethlehem Steel Company shipyard, at Hingham, Massachusetts, launched on 13 March 1943, sponsored by Mrs. E. R. Donnell, mother of Ensign Donnell, and commissioned on 26 June 1943.

Battle of the Atlantic
Donnell sailed from Boston on 31 August 1943 for trans-Atlantic convoy duty. She guarded the safe passage of four convoys to Derry and return in the buildup for the invasion of Europe in June. Simultaneously she was struck by a torpedo which blew off her stern. Explosion of her own depth charges inflicted additional damage on the escort. Her casualties were 29 killed and 25 wounded. Arriving after a 300-mile dash in response to a call from Donnell, an 18-hour hunt by the 2nd Support Group under Captain Frederic John Walker began which brought U-473 to the surface, where she was sunk by gunfire.

Operation Overlord
Since repairs would have involved extensive reconstruction, she was placed in commission in reserve at Lisahally, Northern Ireland, on 20 June 1944, for use as an accommodation ship.

Electric power supplies were needed at newly captured ports on in France before the electric grid and electric power generating stations could be returned to service.  Since Donnell had a large turbo-electric generator, but was not able to sail by herself because of the damage she had sustained, the ship was converted to an electric power barge and reclassified IX-182 on 15 July 1944.  Donnell was towed to Plymouth, England, in July to embark passengers, take on cargo, and have electric power cables installed in place of her torpedo tubes.  Donnell was towed in August to Cherbourg-Octeville, where she supplied electric power to shore installations.  The experiment was such a success, that a few other destroyer escorts had their torpedo tubes removed and replaced by electric power cables and power supply equipment for use at other locations.

Decommissioning and fate
In February 1945 she was returned to England, and served as barracks ship at Portland and Plymouth until towed back to the United States, arriving at the Philadelphia Navy Yard on 18 July 1945.  She was decommissioned on 23 October 1945, and sold for scrap on 29 April 1946.

Gallery

References

External links 

 

 

Buckley-class destroyer escorts
World War II frigates and destroyer escorts of the United States
World War II auxiliary ships of the United States
Ships built in Hingham, Massachusetts
1943 ships
Maritime incidents in May 1944